This is a list of electoral divisions and wards in the ceremonial county of West Yorkshire in Yorkshire and the Humber. All changes since the re-organisation of local government following the passing of the Local Government Act 1972 are shown. The number of councillors elected for each electoral division or ward is shown in brackets.

District councils

Bradford
Wards from 1 April 1974 (first election 10 May 1973) to 1 May 1980:

Wards from 1 May 1980 to 10 June 2004:

Wards from 10 June 2004 to present:

† minor boundary changes in 2008

Calderdale
Wards from 1 April 1974 (first election 10 May 1973) to 1 May 1980:

Wards from 1 May 1980 to 10 June 2004:

Wards from 10 June 2004 to present:

Kirklees
Wards from 1 April 1974 (first election 10 May 1973) to 6 May 1982:

Wards from 6 May 1982 to 10 June 2004:

Wards from 10 June 2004 to present:

Leeds
Wards from 1 April 1974 (first election 10 May 1973) to 1 May 1980:

Wards from 1 May 1980 to 10 June 2004:

Wards from 10 June 2004 to 3 May 2018:

Wards from 3 May 2018 to present:

Wakefield
Wards from 1 April 1974 (first election 10 May 1973) to 6 May 1982:

Wards from 6 May 1982 to 10 June 2004:

Wards from 10 June 2004 to present:

Former county council

West Yorkshire
Electoral Divisions from 1 April 1974 (first election 12 April 1973) to 1 April 1986 (county abolished):

Electoral Divisions due from 2 May 1985 (order revoked by the Local Government Act 1985):

Electoral wards by constituency

Bradford East
Bolton and Undercliffe, Bowling and Barkerend, Bradford Moor, Eccleshill, Idle and Thackley, Little Horton.

Bradford South
Great Horton, Queensbury, Royds, Tong, Wibsey, Wyke.

Bradford West
City, Clayton and Fairweather Green, Heaton, Manningham, Thornton and Allerton, Toller.

Keighley
Craven, Ilkley, Keighley Central, Keighley East, Keighley West, Worth Valley.

Shipley
Baildon, Bingley, Bingley Rural, Shipley, Wharfedale, Windhill and Wrose.

Calder Valley
Brighouse, Calder, Elland, Greetland and Stainland, Hipperholme and Lightcliffe, Luddendenfoot, Rastrick, Ryburn, Todmorden.

Halifax
Illingworth and Mixenden, Northowram and Shelf, Ovenden, Park, Skircoat, Sowerby Bridge, Town, Warley.

Batley and Spen
Batley East, Batley West, Birstall and Birkenshaw, Cleckheaton, Heckmondwike, Liversedge and Gomersal.

Colne Valley
Colne Valley, Crosland Moor and Netherton, Golcar, Holme Valley North, Holme Valley South, Lindley.

Dewsbury
Denby Dale, Dewsbury East, Dewsbury South, Dewsbury West, Kirkburton, Mirfield.

Huddersfield
Almondbury, Ashbrow, Dalton, Greenhead, Newsome.

Elmet and Rothwell
Garforth and Swillington, Harewood, Kippax and Methley, Rothwell, Wetherby.

Leeds Central
Beeston and Holbeck, Burmantofts and Richmond Hill, Hunslet and Riverside, Little London and Woodhouse, Middleton Park.

Leeds East
Cross Gates and Whinmoor, Gipton and Harehills, Killingbeck and Seacroft, Temple Newsam.

Leeds North East
Alwoodley, Chapel Allerton, Moortown, Roundhay.

Leeds North West
Adel and Wharfedale, Headingley and Hyde Park, Otley and Yeadon, Weetwood.

Leeds West
Armley, Bramley and Stanningley, Farnley and Wortley, Kirkstall.

Morley and Outwood
Ardsley and Robin Hood, Morley North, Morley South, Stanley and Outwood East, Wrenthorpe and Outwood West

Pudsey
Calverley and Farsley, Guiseley and Rawdon, Horsforth, Pudsey.

Hemsworth
Ackworth, North Elmsall and Upton, Crofton, Ryhill and Walton, Featherstone, Hemsworth, South Elmsall and South Kirkby, Wakefield South.

Normanton, Pontefract and Castleford
Airedale and Ferry Fryston, Altofts and Whitwood, Castleford Central and Glasshoughton, Knottingley, Normanton, Pontefract North, Pontefract South.

Wakefield
Horbury and South Ossett, Ossett, Wakefield East, Wakefield North, Wakefield Rural, Wakefield West.

See also
List of parliamentary constituencies in West Yorkshire

References
http://www.opsi.gov.uk/si/si2007/uksi_20071681_en_1

West Yorkshire
 
Electoral wards